The Peoria Lock and Dam is a historic lock and dam complex on the Illinois River at Creve Coeur, Illinois. The complex was built in 1938-39 as part of an effort to make the river navigable and establish a route for barges between Chicago and the Mississippi River. The U.S. Army Corps of Engineers designed the complex; their influence is particularly evident in the dam's control station, as the State of Illinois designed most other dam control stations along the river. The control station is for the most part a large, functional building, though it has Art Deco surrounds at the main entrance. The district also contains an original maneuver boat designed to raise and lower the dam's wicket gates; the boat is still used and is one of four boats of its kind left in the United States.

The complex was added to the National Register of Historic Places on March 10, 2004.

References

Dams on the National Register of Historic Places in Illinois
Dams completed in 1939
National Register of Historic Places in Tazewell County, Illinois
Illinois River
Historic districts on the National Register of Historic Places in Illinois
Transportation buildings and structures in Tazewell County, Illinois